Chicks Incorporated were an Australian dance rock band formed in Brisbane, Queensland in 1977. Their sound was largely derived from American soul, funk, pop, rock and disco.  Starting out as an almost all-female band with guitarist Chris Mitchell being the only male member, they were led by the late drummer Miriam Curtis, who produced their sole album "Security" in 1980.  They attracted a lot of local attention due to their sexy appearance and wild dancing.

The band's first single was "Jive To Stay Alive" released on RCA Records, and was also featured on a few disco compilation albums such as "Dats Disco" on RCA.  Most of the band's material was written by well-respected Brisbane songwriters Laurie Stone and Peter Moscos, as well as keyboard player David Bentley, formerly of Python Lee Jackson and best known for the hit "In A Broken Dream" which was sung by Rod Stewart.

The band shortened their name to "Chicks" in 1979, but despite being signed with a major label, they had several problems finding and retaining competent members.  Their final appearance on an album was "Stormy Nights" on the compilation "That's Queensland" issued by radio station 4IP.  The song was a departure from their early dance orientated material and geared towards the electro-pop sound of the early 80's and the band eventually split up.

Bass player Sue Neilson is very active on the Brisbane corporate rock music scene today, whilst Curtis died in early 2012.  Her husband Barry Petrel runs the Australian website Baby Boomers Website, and will be creating a page in memory of her musical achievements and service to her country and community.  Saxophonist Pamela Withnell joined the Sydney band The Party Girls after her departure from the band, and she now performs on the jazz scene.

Discography

Singles
1977 Jive To Stay Alive/Do It                  (RCA) 103040
1978 Inside Information/Let Me Take You There  (RCA) 103262
1979 I'm On Fire/B Side The C Side             (RCA) 103476
1980 Movie Star/Can't Take It With Me          (RCA) 103685

Albums
1980 Security                                  (RCA)

Musical groups from Brisbane
Dance bands
Musical groups established in 1977
Musical groups disestablished in 1981